Atelopus nicefori is a species of toad in the family Bufonidae.
It is endemic to Colombia.
Its natural habitats are subtropical or tropical moist montane forests and rivers.
It is threatened by habitat loss.

References

Sources

nicefori
Amphibians of Colombia
Amphibians of the Andes
Taxa named by Juan A. Rivero
Amphibians described in 1963
Taxonomy articles created by Polbot